Melle is a city in the district of Osnabrück, Lower Saxony, Germany. The city corresponds to what used to be the district of Melle until regional territorial reform in 1972. Since then Melle is the third largest city in Lower Saxony in terms of surface area.

History
Melle was first mentioned in a document from 1169. In 1443 Heinrich von Moers, Bishop of Osnabrück, gave Melle the privilege of a Wigbold. Osnabrück looked after Melle's interests in the Westphalian Hanseatic League. Melle belonged to the Kingdom of Hanover until 1866 when it became part of Prussia. In 1885 Amt Grönenberg and the municipality Melle formed the prussian district Kreis Melle. The district Melle later on became the municipality Melle. In 1972 the former district with its 56 municipalities were united to the city Melle which since then is  part of Osnabrück (district).

Geography

Geographical position
Melle is situated in a valley penned between the Wiehen Hills in the North and the Teutoburg Forest in the South.

Neighbouring towns
Neighbouring towns are Preußisch Oldendorf in the North Rhine-Westphalian Minden-Lübbecke district, Rödinghausen, Bünde and Spenge in the North Rhine-Westphalian Herford district, Werther and Borgholzhausen in the North Rhine-Westphalian Gütersloh district, as well as Dissen, Hilter, Bissendorf, and Bad Essen in the Osnabrück district.

Municipalities
The city consists of the eight municipalities of Melle-Mitte, Buer, Bruchmühlen, Gesmold, Neuenkirchen, Oldendorf, Riemsloh and Wellingholzhausen.

Religion
 Christian confessions:
 Evangelical Lutheran Church: 22.579
 Evangelical Reformed Church: 244
 Roman Catholic Church: 15.036
 Old Catholic Church
 Evangelical Free Church (Baptists)
 Russian Orthodox Church
 Greek Orthodox Church
 New Apostolic Church
 The Church of Jesus Christ of Latter-day Saints (Mormon): 9
 Muslims
 Jews
 none: 10.061
 not known: 91

Last updated: 31 December 2007

Politics

Mayor
Jutta Dettmann (SPD) is mayor of Melle, elected in 2021.

City council
The city council is composed of 40 members. Additionally the city mayor is eligible to vote.

(As of: Local elections on 11 September 2011)

Further election results

(Source: Official election results of the County of Osnabrück)

Twin towns – sister cities

Melle is twinned with:

 Bad Dürrenberg, Germany
 Cires-lès-Mello, France
 Eecke, France
 Eiken, Switzerland
 Eke (Nazareth), Belgium
 Ghent, Belgium
 Jēkabpils, Latvia
 Melle, Belgium
 Melle, France
 Niğde, Turkey
 Reinickendorf (Berlin), Germany
 Torzhok, Russia

Melle also has friendly relations with New Melle, Missouri, United States.

Economy
A substantial economic factor for Melle is the wood processing industry. Further important branches are metal, food, and plastics processing. Tetra (company) was founded in Melle. In recent years Melle has more and more become a logistics site along the A 30 motorway.

Culture and sights

There are two astronomical observatories in the surrounding of Melle providing guided tours for the public. The EXPO 2000 observatory in Melle-Oberholsten runs the largest Newtonian telescope used for public observation.

Notable people 
Hermann von der Hardt (1660 – 1746), German historian and orientalist, born at Melle
Hermann Meyer-Rabingen (1887 – 1961), German general in the Wehrmacht during World War II
Ilse Losa (1913—2006), Portuguese writer and translator of German-Jewish origin, born at Buer in Melle
Axel Bulthaupt (born 1966), journalist and television presenter
Perry Leenhouts (born 1972), Dutch-American musician and producer

References

External links

Official website

 
Osnabrück (district)